Jeffrey David Ullman (born November 22, 1942) is an American computer scientist and the Stanford W. Ascherman Professor of Engineering, Emeritus, at Stanford University. His textbooks on compilers (various editions are popularly known as the dragon book), theory of computation (also known as the Cinderella book), data structures, and databases are regarded as standards in their fields. He and his long-time collaborator Alfred Aho are the recipients of the 2020 Turing Award, generally recognized as the highest distinction in computer science.

Career
Ullman received a Bachelor of Science degree in engineering mathematics from Columbia University in 1963 and his PhD in electrical engineering from Princeton University in 1966. He then worked for three years at Bell Labs.  In 1969, he returned to Princeton as an associate professor, and was promoted to full professor in 1974.  Ullman moved to Stanford University in 1979, and served as the department chair from 1990 to 1994.  He was named the Stanford W. Ascherman Professor of Computer Science in 1994, and became an Emeritus in 2003.  

In 1994 Ullman was inducted as a Fellow of the Association for Computing Machinery; in 2000 he was awarded the Knuth Prize. Ullman is the co-recipient (with John Hopcroft) of the 2010 IEEE John von Neumann Medal "For laying the foundations for the fields of automata and language theory and many seminal contributions to theoretical computer science." Ullman, Hopcroft, and Alfred Aho were co-recipients of the 2017 C&C Prize awarded by NEC Corporation.

Ullman's research interests include database theory, data integration, data mining, and education using online infrastructure. He is one of the founders of the field of database theory: many of his Ph.D. students became influential in the field as well. He was the Ph.D. advisor of Sergey Brin, one of the co-founders of Google, and served on Google's technical advisory board. He is a founder of Gradiance Corporation, which provides homework grading support for college courses. He teaches courses on automata and mining massive datasets on the Stanford Online learning platform.

Ullman was elected as a member of the National Academy of Sciences in 2020. He also sits on the advisory board of TheOpenCode Foundation.  On March 31, 2021, he and Aho were named recipients of 2020 Turing Award.

Controversies 
In 2011, Ullman stated his opposition to assisting Iranians in becoming graduate students at Stanford, because of the anti-Israel position of the Iranian government. In response to a call by the National Iranian American Council for disciplinary action against Ullman for what they described as his "racially discriminatory and inflammatory" comments, a Stanford spokesperson stated that Ullman was expressing his own personal views and not the views of the university, and that he was uninvolved in admissions.

In April 2021, an open letter by CSForInclusion criticized the ACM and the ACM A.M. Turing Award Committee for nominating and selecting Ullman as recipient of the ACM A.M. Turing award. ACM reconfirmed its commitments to inclusion and diversity in a response to the letter.

Books 
Mining of massive datasets (with Jure Leskovec and Anand Rajaraman), Prentice-Hall, Second edition 2014. 
Database Systems: The Complete Book (with H. Garcia-Molina and J. Widom), Prentice-Hall, Englewood Cliffs, NJ, 2002. 
Introduction to Automata Theory, Languages, and Computation, (with J. E. Hopcroft and R. Motwani), Addison-Wesley, Reading MA, 1969, 1979, 2000.
Elements of ML Programming, Prentice-Hall, Englewood Cliffs, NJ, 1993, 1998. 
A First Course in Database Systems (with J. Widom), Prentice-Hall, Englewood Cliffs, NJ, 1997, 2002.
Foundations of Computer Science (with A. V. Aho), Computer Science Press, New York, 1992. C edition, 1995.
Principles of Database and Knowledge-Base Systems (two volumes), Computer Science Press, New York, 1988, 1989.
Volume 1: Classical Database Systems 
Volume 2: The New Technologies 
Compilers: Principles, Techniques, and Tools (with A. V. Aho and R. Sethi), Addison-Wesley, Reading MA, 1977, 1986.
Computational Aspects of VLSI, Computer Science Press, 1984 
Data Structures and Algorithms (with A. V. Aho and J. E. Hopcroft), Addison-Wesley, Reading MA, 1983. 
Principles of Compiler Design (with A. V. Aho), Addison-Wesley, Reading, MA, 1977.
Fundamental Concepts of Programming Systems, Addison-Wesley, Reading MA, 1976. 
The Design and Analysis of Computer Algorithms (with A. V. Aho and J. E. Hopcroft), Addison-Wesley, Reading MA, 1974. 
Formal Languages and Their Relation to Automata (with J. E. Hopcroft), Addison-Wesley, Reading MA, 1969.

References

External links
 
 

1942 births
Living people
Database researchers
Fellows of the Association for Computing Machinery
Scientists at Bell Labs
Knuth Prize laureates
Columbia School of Engineering and Applied Science alumni
Princeton University alumni
Stanford University School of Engineering faculty
Turing Award laureates
American computer scientists
Fellows of the American Academy of Arts and Sciences
Members of the United States National Academy of Engineering
Anti-Iranian sentiments
People associated with the National College of Ireland